The National Polish-American Sports Hall of Fame and Museum was founded in 1973. The mission of the National Polish-American Sports Hall of Fame is to recognize and preserve outstanding achievement by individuals of Polish heritage in the field of sports and to educate the entire community with the hope of encouraging and inspiring personal excellence. The hall is located in Troy, Michigan.

Each year, inductees are elected in a nationwide vote among NPASHF officers, Hall of Fame inductees and more than 500 members of the Sports Panel Council. With over 150 inductees, the National Polish-American Sports Hall of Fame has an outstanding collection of historic artifacts on display at the American Polish Cultural Center in Troy, Michigan. Stan Musial, the first inductee, is represented with items worthy of being in Cooperstown.
Visitors can also see uniforms worn by greats such as Steve Gromek, Carol Blazejowski, Mark Fidrych and Ed Olczyk; the boxing gloves used by 1940s heavyweight champion Tony Zale; basketballs, baseballs, footballs, and bowling balls used and signed by Mike Krzyzewski, Whitey Kurowski, Ted Marchibroda, and Eddie Lubanski.  Among other items is a football signed by Bob Skoronski, Vince Lombardi and other members of the 1967 Super Bowl I Champion Green Bay Packers.

In 2013, the Hall of Fame instituted its NPASHF Excellence in Sports Award and race driver Brad Keselowski was the initial recipient. Other winners include Liz Johnson, Frank Kaminsky, Gary Kubiak, Joe Maddon, Dave Dombrowski, and Sam Mikulak. In 2022, Natalie Wojcik of the University of Michigan was awarded the Excellence in Sports Award by the National Polish-American Sports Hall of Fame.

The Hall of Fame inon June 20, 2019, named its inaugural Excellence in Media Award the Tony Kubek Award and Adrian Wojnarowski of ESPN was the inaugural recipient. Sportswriter Joe Posnanski won in 2021.

The National Polish-American Sports Hall of Fame held its 49th Annual Induction Banquet on June 16, 2022, inducting Mark Dantonio, Mark Gubicza, Loreejon Ogonowski and John Danowski. Celebrating 50 years, the NPASHF will host a gala on September 14, 2023 in Troy, Michigan.

Baseball

Oscar Bielaski (2005)
Stan Coveleski (1976)
Art "Pinky" Deras (2011)
Moe Drabowsky (1999)
Mark Fidrych (2009)
Steve Gromek (1981)
Mark Grudzielanek (2019)
Mark Gubicza (2022)
Ryan Klesko (2014)
Ted Kluszewski (1974)
Jim Konstanty (2008)
Mike Krukow (2020)
Tony Kubek (1982)
Whitey Kurowski (1988)
Bob Kuzava (2003)
Eddie Lopat (1978)
Stan Lopata (1997)
Greg Luzinski (1989)
Bill Mazeroski (1979)
Barney McCosky (1995)
Stan Musial (1973)
Joe Niekro (1992)
Phil Niekro (1990)
Danny Ozark (2010)
Tom Paciorek (1992)
Ron Perranoski (1983)
A. J. Pierzynski (2020)
Johnny Podres (2002)
Jack Quinn (2006)
Ron Reed (2005)
Jenny Romatowski (1999)
Ray Sadecki (2007)
Al Simmons (1975)
Bill Skowron (1980)
Frank Tanana (1996)
Alan Trammell (1998)
Connie Wisniewski (2020)
Carl Yastrzemski (1986)
Richie Zisk (2004)

Basketball

Carol Blazejowski (1994)
Vince Boryla (1984)
Ann Meyers Drysdale (2016)
Mike Gminski (2003)
Tom Gola (1977)
Bobby Hurley (2006)
Larry Krystkowiak (2018)
Mike Krzyzewski (1991)
Mitch Kupchak (2002)
Bob Kurland (1996)
Christian Laettner (2008)
June Olkowski (2012)
John Payak (1982)
Juliene Brazinski Simpson (2017)
Kelly Tripucka (2000)

Billiards
Loree Jon Hasson (2022)
Frank Taberski (2020)

Bowling
Johnny Crimmins (1976)
Billy Golembiewski (1981)
Cass Grygier (1984)
Eddie Lubanski (1978)
Aleta Rzepecki-Sill (2008)
Ann Setlock (1983)

Boxing
Duane Bobick (2014)
Bobby Czyz (2009)
Stanley Ketchel (1984)
Teddy Yarosz (2005)
Tony Zale (1975)

Fencing
Janusz Bednarski (2017)

Figure Skating
Janet Lynn (1990)
Elaine Zayak (2013)

American Football

Danny Abramowicz (1992)
Pete Banaszak (1990)
Steve Bartkowski (1993)
Zeke Bratkowski (1995)
Bob Brudzinski (2005)
Lou Creekmur (2001)
Zygmont Czarobski (1980)
Mark Dantonio (2022)
Mike Ditka (2001)
Conrad Dobler (2018)
Jim Dombrowski (2013)
Forest Evashevski (2000)
Frank Gatski (1989)
Jim Grabowski (1993)
Jack Ham (1987)
Leon Hart (1988)
Vic Janowicz (1987)
Ron Jaworski (1991)
Mike Kenn (2006)
Joe Klecko (1999)
Ed Klewicki (1982)
Gary Kubiak (2017)
Frank Kush (1998)
Ted Kwalick (2005)
Greg Landry (2012)
Johnny Lujack (1978)
Ted Marchibroda (1976)
Chester Marcol (2016)
Mike McCoy (2019)
Lou Michaels (1994)
Walt Michaels (1997)
Dick Modzelewski (1986)
Mike Munchak (2003)
Bronko Nagurski (2020)
Tom Nowatzke (2008)
Dominic Olejniczak (2020)
Bill Osmanski (1977)
Walt Patulski (2014)
Frank Piekarski (2005)
Bill Romanowski (2011)
Mark Rypien (2006)
Tom Sestak (2007)
Bob Skoronski (2000)
Emil Sitko (2020)
Hank Stram (1985)
Dick Szymanski (1994)
Frank Szymanski (1995)
Frank Tripucka (1997)
Steve Wisniewski (2004)
Alex Wojciechowicz (1975)

Golf
Billy Burke (2005)
Betsy King (2000)
Warren Orlick (1983)
Bob Toski (1987)
Al Watrous (1979)
Evan Williams (2018)

Gymnastics
George Szypula (1985)

Ice Hockey
Walter Broda (2005)
Len Ceglarski (1993)
Joe Kocur (2016)
Tom Lysiak (2012)
Allison Mleczko (2019)
Ed Olczyk (2004)
Bryan Smolinski (2015)
Pete Stemkowski (2002)

Lacrosse
John Danowski (2022)

Motor Sports
Tony Adamowicz (2016)
Tom D'Eath (2011)
Alan Kulwicki (2001)

Skiing
Kristina Koznick (2015)

Softball
Ed Tyson (1974)

Sports Journalism
Ed Browalski (1983)
Billy Packer (1988)

Sports Officials
Steve Javie (2017)
Stan Javie (2011)
Red Mihalik (1996)

Speed Skating
J.R. Celski (2020)

Swimming
Rachel Komisarz Baugh (2018)
Chet Jastremski (2007)
Kristy Kowal (2010)
Joe Verdeur (2009)

Taekwondo
Arlene Limas (2019)

Tennis
Jane "Peaches" Bartkowicz (2010)
Frank Parker (1988)

Track & Field
Bob Gutowski (1980)
Stella Walsh (1974)
Frances Sobczak Kaszubski (2020)

Volleyball
 Andy Banachowski (2009)
 Randy Stoklos (2015)

Water Polo
Monte Nitzkowski (2016)

Weightlifting
Norbert Schemansky (1979)
Stanley Stanczyk (1991)

Wrestling
Władek "Killer" Kowalski (2007)
Stanley Zbyszko (1983)

See also
Polish American Museum
Polish Museum of America

References

External links
 

Polish-American culture in Metro Detroit
All-sports halls of fame
Polish
Ethnic museums in Michigan
Sports museums in Michigan
Polish-American organizations
Awards established in 1973
1973 establishments in Michigan
Polish-American museums